Manufacturers Bank is an American banking subsidiarity of the Japanese Sumitomo Mitsui Banking Corporation.

Manufacturers Bank may also refer to:
Manufacturers Hanover Corporation, a defunct bank headquartered in New York City
Manufacturer's National Bank, a defunct bank and extant building in Lewiston, Maine
Manufacturers and Traders Trust Company, the full name of M&T Bank